All American Gangsta is the sixth studio album by American rapper E.S.G., from Houston, Texas. It was released on September 14, 2004, via S.E.S. Entertainment. It features guest appearances from Slim Thug, Brandon Stacks, Bun B, Mr. Que, Fat Pat and A.G. The album peaked at number 73 on the Top R&B/Hip-Hop Albums in the US Billboard charts.

Track listing

Personnel

Cedric Dormaine Hill – main artist, executive producer
Stayve Jerome Thomas – featured artist (tracks: 5, 7, 11, 16)
Brandon Stacks – featured artist (tracks: 5, 19)
Bernard Freeman – featured artist (track 7)
Patrick Lamark Hawkins – featured artist (track 8)
Ideal – featured artist (track 13)
A.G. – featured artist (track 19), additional vocals (tracks: 2, 4, 9, 11)
Mr. Que – featured artist (track 19)
Kindle Rogers – additional vocals (track 4)
Big Craig – additional vocals (track 6)
Junyo – additional vocals (track 6)
Ms. Marylin – additional vocals (tracks: 7, 12, 14-15)
Taylor Gammage – additional vocals (track 8)
Tia Williams – additional vocals (track 8)
FEVA – additional vocals (track 9)
Nanu – additional vocals (track 10)
Sinclair "Sin" Ridley – additional vocals (tracks: 11, 18), programming (tracks: 2-3, 6-7, 11, 13, 18), mixing, recording, mastering, producer, executive producer
Kirby – additional vocals (track 17)
T May – programming (tracks: 1, 19)
Sadik "BEAsTMASTER" McNeil – programming (track 4)
John "Big Swift" Catalon – programming (tracks: 5, 8-9, 17)
Dantly "Prowla" Wyatt – programming (tracks: 10, 14, 16)
Quincy "Q-Stone" Whetstone – programming (tracks: 12, 15)
The Staff – producer
Mike Frost – artwork & design

Charts

References

2004 albums
E.S.G. (rapper) albums
Gangsta rap albums by American artists